1971 French Syndicate of Cinema Critics Awards
1971

Best French Film:
The Wild Child(L'enfant sauvage)  
The 1971 French Syndicate of Cinema Critics Awards, honored the best in film for 1970.

Winners 
Best French Film: The Wild Child (L'enfant sauvage) by François Truffaut
Best Foreign Film: Andrey Rublyov (Soviet Union) by Andrei Tarkovsky

References

External links 
1971 French Syndicate of Cinema Critics Awards at the IMDB

1971 film awards
French Union of Film Critics Awards
1970s in French cinema